The Colorado Liquor Enforcement Division (or Division of Liquor/Tobacco Enforcement) is a division of the Colorado Department of Revenue, an agency charged with the regulation of alcoholic beverages within the state of Colorado.

See also
State of Colorado

External links
Official website

State alcohol agencies of the United States
State law enforcement agencies of Colorado